Darren Coil Anthony Stephenson (born 6 March 1993) is a Jamaican professional footballer who plays for Chester as a left winger and striker.

Career
Stephenson made his senior debut for Bradford City on 26 March 2011, having been promoted to the first-team squad two days before, with squad number 29. Stephenson was offered his first professional six-month contract by Bradford on 9 May 2011. On 23 August 2011, Stephenson was given a new two-year contract after impressing staff. The next day, he joined Hinckley United on a month-long loan deal, alongside Luke Dean, before returning to Bradford City in early September 2011, having made just one appearance. On 5 October 2011, Stephenson moved on loan to Woodley Sports, and on 30 January 2012 he moved on loan to Stocksbridge Park Steels. He moved on loan to Southport in March 2012. In August 2012, Stephenson was released from his contract with Bradford City. On 11 August 2012, Stephenson signed for Football Conference side Southport on a twelve-month contract. He joined Chorley on loan on 31 August 2012, scoring on his debut the next day in a 1–0 victory against Ilkeston. He was recalled to Southport on 12 October from his loan spell. Stephenson re-signed for Chorley on a permanent basis in December 2012. He received interest from Hartlepool United in the January 2016 transfer window.

After 62 goals in 157 games for Chorley, he signed for Tranmere Rovers in July 2016. He moved on loan to AFC Fylde in November 2016. He joined Stockport County for the 2017–18 season. He was released by Stockport in May 2019. He re-signed with the club in July 2019. Later that month he broke his leg in a friendly game.

He moved to Curzon Ashton in September 2020, and on loan to FC Halifax Town in April 2021. 

In June 2021, Stephenson joined Chester.

Career statistics

References

1993 births
Living people
Jamaican footballers
English footballers
Bradford City A.F.C. players
Hinckley United F.C. players
Stockport Sports F.C. players
Stocksbridge Park Steels F.C. players
Southport F.C. players
Chorley F.C. players
Tranmere Rovers F.C. players
AFC Fylde players
Stockport County F.C. players
Curzon Ashton F.C. players
FC Halifax Town players
Chester F.C. players
English Football League players
Association football wingers
Association football forwards
People from Saint Catherine Parish